Aalbæk railway station is a railway station serving the small coastal town of Aalbæk in Vendsyssel, Denmark.

The station is located on the Skagensbanen railway line from Skagen to Frederikshavn between Bunken and Napstjært halts. The train services are currently operated by Nordjyske Jernbaner which run frequent local train services between Skagen station and Frederikshavn station.

History 

The station opened in 1890 when the railway started. In 1915, the Danish Parliament agreed to build a new railway line between Aalbæk and Hjørring, but it was only the first part between Hjørring and Vellingshøj stations that was built. Instead, that railway was extended to Hirtshals and this is today the Hirtshalsbanen railway line.

The station building was built in 1932–33. It was the last drawn by the architect Ulrik Plesner before his death.

Operations 
The train services are currently operated by the railway company Nordjyske Jernbaner (NJ) which run frequent local train services from Skagen station to Frederikshavn station with onward connections to the rest of Denmark.

References

Bibliography

External links

 Nordjyske Jernbaner – Danish railway company operating in North Jutland Region
 Danske Jernbaner – website with information on railway history in Denmark
 Nordjyllands Jernbaner – website with information on railway history in North Jutland

Railway stations in the North Jutland Region
Railway stations opened in 1890
Ulrik Plesner railway stations
Railway stations in Denmark opened in the 19th century